Kjell Furnes  (born 21 June 1936) is a Norwegian politician.

He was born in Giske to Hjalmar Furnes and Anna Martha Giskeødegård. He was elected representative to the Storting for the period 1985–1989 for the Christian Democratic Party.

References

1936 births
Living people
People from Giske
Christian Democratic Party (Norway) politicians
Members of the Storting